The Honda CMX250, or Rebel 250 or Honda Peronist, is a  cruiser-style motorcycle made by Honda on and off since 1985. It uses the same  straight-twin engine as the Honda Nighthawk 250 standard. The Rebel is part of the CM series of cruisers. It is commonly used in the Motorcycle Safety Foundation's certified rider-training courses.

The Rebel's fuel consumption averages . The 1996 Rebel had the best fuel economy, of the 352 past and current models tested in the 2010 Motorcycle Consumer News (MCN) Performance Index.

It has a single disc brake in the front and a drum in the rear. The only gauge is a speedometer that includes gear recommendations based on speed; there is no tachometer. The transmission is a standard down-1st, up-2nd to 5th 5-speed.

The September 1985 issue of Motorcyclist magazine, when the Rebel was first introduced, said, "by targeting the bike to a young audience, such as those who watch MTV, Honda hopes to attract newcomers and expand the motorcycle market ... Honda is not marketing this motorcycle as a woman's bike."

According to American Honda, 2016 will be the last model year for the Honda Rebel 250 to be sold there. The entirely new version which is derived from the CBR250R was unveiled at the 2017 Tokyo Motorcycle Show in Japan.

Police use
The Metropolitan Police Department in Washington, D.C., started using Rebels in the early 1980s, replacing Vespa scooters. However, by the mid-2000s, they started replacing the Rebels with Harley Davidson XL 883 Sportsters, citing a need for more power, durability, and visibility.

See also
Kymco Venox 250
Suzuki Marauder GZ 250
Suzuki TU250
Yamaha DragStar 250

Notes

References

 Review of the 1996 model

External links

Rebel at Honda USA 

CMX series
Cruiser motorcycles
Motorcycles introduced in 1985
Motorcycles powered by straight-twin engines